Carl Larvick (June 19, 1882 – April 10, 1960) was a United States politician and state representative  from North Dakota. He served in the North Dakota House of Representatives from 1927 to 1930.

Political career
Larson represented the 26th Legislative District, which included Emmons County and Kidder County.

Personal life
He was married to Clara (Holm) Larvick (1887–1972). They were the parents of three children; Martin, Harold and Margaret.  He and his family operated a farm in Temvik, North Dakota.  He was buried in Greenwood Cemetery in Bayfield County, Wisconsin.

References

External links

Members of the North Dakota House of Representatives
1882 births
1960 deaths
People from Emmons County, North Dakota
American Lutherans
20th-century American politicians
20th-century Lutherans